Lewis Compton (7 November 1892 – 24 October 1942) was an officer in the United States Navy during World War I.

Biography
Born in Perth Amboy, New Jersey, Compton enrolled in the United States Naval Reserve 22 March 1917. After active duty in World War I, he continued to take part in training until resigning from the Reserve 1 July 1932.

After a career of public service in New Jersey, he became special assistant to the Assistant Secretary of the Navy. He himself was Assistant Secretary of the Navy from 9 February 1940 to 13 February 1941.

He died in New York 24 October 1942.

 was named for him.

References

United States Navy officers
1892 births
1942 deaths
United States Assistant Secretaries of the Navy